Churches of Christ Uniting was a proposed name for a body growing out of the Consultation on the Church Union which began in 1962 among ten predominantly "mainline"  U.S. Protestant denominations.  The consolidation proposed in the original scheme was overwhelmingly rejected when put to a vote of the constituent denominations in 1969, so the leaders, unwilling to abandon totally this effort, adopted more of a "go slow" approach.  Groups within the Consultation began closer contacts, and in some instances full communion, with each other, and the idea to call the group that was hoped to be formed in the long term Church of Christ United was proposed, with the interim name while the process was ongoing to be Church of Christ Uniting.  (These names had the additional advantage of having the same initials as the initial Consultation on the Church Union.)

Opposition within the component denominations, particularly the United Presbyterian Church, caused any plan for a full merger to be put on hold, and a new name, seemingly implying that "uniting" is a presently-ongoing but perhaps long-term goal, was adopted, Churches Uniting in Christ.  (This name also had the advantage of not sounding as much like one of the existing constituent groups, the United Church of Christ, nor like an entirely unrelated one, the Church of Christ.)

References

1962 in Christianity
Former Christian denominations